Frederick Gymer Parsons FRCS FZS (1863 – 11 March 1943) was a British writer and scientist, specialising in the fields of anatomy and anthropology. He contributed numerous anatomical articles to the 1911 eleventh edition of Encyclopædia Britannica.

References

External links

1863 births
1943 deaths
English anthropologists
English anatomists
English encyclopedists
English science writers
Fellows of the Royal College of Surgeons
Fellows of the Zoological Society of London
Fellows of the Society of Antiquaries of London